Hamza Nagga (born 29 May 1990 in Tunis, Tunisia) is a Tunisian volleyball player. He is 191 cm high and plays as opposite hitter. He was part of the Tunisian team at the 2012 and 2020 Summer Olympics.

Clubs

Awards

Club
  1 Tunisian League (2014)
  1 Tunisian Cup (2011)

National team
  1 Arab Championship (2012)
  1 African Championship U21 (2008)

References

Sportspeople from Tunis
1990 births
Living people
Volleyball players at the 2012 Summer Olympics
Tunisian men's volleyball players
Olympic volleyball players of Tunisia
Mediterranean Games silver medalists for Tunisia
Competitors at the 2013 Mediterranean Games
Mediterranean Games medalists in volleyball
Volleyball players at the 2020 Summer Olympics
20th-century Tunisian people
21st-century Tunisian people